Katharina Schratt (11 September 1853 – 17 April 1940) was an Austrian actress who became "the uncrowned Empress of Austria" as a confidante of Emperor Franz Joseph.

Life
Katharina Schratt was born in Baden bei Wien, the only daughter of stationery dealer Anton Schratt (1804–1883); she had two brothers. From the age of six, she took an interest in theatre. Her parents tried to discourage her from becoming an actress and sent her to a boarding school in Cologne, however, this only increased her ambition. She finally was allowed to take acting lessons in Vienna and gave her debut at the age of 17 in her hometown.

Acting career

In 1872, she joined the ensemble of the Royal Court Theatre in Berlin, achieving considerable success in a short time. Schratt left Germany after only a few months, following the call of the Viennese to join their City Theatre. Her performance made her a leading lady of the Viennese stage.

In 1879 she married the Hungarian magnate and consular officer Nikolaus, Baron Kiss von Ittebe (1852–1909), and gave birth to a son, Anton Kiss von Ittebe (1880–1970). Soon after, Schratt and her husband separated due to incompatibility.

Schratt toured overseas, and appeared in New York City, after which she returned permanently to Vienna's Hofburgtheater. She was one of Austria's most popular actresses until she retired in 1900, following disagreement with theatre director Paul Schlenther.

Royal friend and confidante

Schratt's appearances and performances in the early 1880s at Hofburgtheater captivated Franz Joseph, and she was invited to perform for visiting Czar Alexander III of Russia at Kremsier Castle. She soon became Franz Joseph's companion. It is said that Franz Joseph's wife Empress Elisabeth actually encouraged the relationship between the actress and the Emperor.

After Elisabeth's assassination in 1898, their relationship continued, with one interruption (1900/01, due to a difference in opinions), until the emperor's death in November 1916. She was rewarded with a generous lifestyle including a mansion on Vienna's Gloriettegasse, near Schönbrunn Palace and a mansion in Bad Ischl. In addition, her gambling debts were paid by him. Upon her husband's death in 1909, she also inherited Palais Königswarter, a three-story palace on Vienna's Kärntner Ring boulevard, just across from the State Opera.

Schratt was a friend of notable men such as Count Johann Nepomuk von Wilczek or Prince Ferdinand I of Bulgaria. Her relationship with the Emperor lasted for 34 years, but remained platonic.

Later years and death
After the death of Franz Joseph, she lived completely withdrawn in her palace on the Kärntner Ring. In the 1930s, journalists bothered her to talk about her relationship with the late Emperor. Book companies asked her to write her memoirs, however Schratt would always say, "I am an actress not a writer and I have nothing to say, for I was never a Pompadour, still less a Maintenon." In her later years, Schratt became deeply religious. She visited Emperor Franz Joseph's and Empress Elisabeth's tomb in the Kapuzinergruft daily. The former actress also loved animals and donated money to animal shelters.  She died in 1940 at the age of 86. She was buried at Hietzing Cemetery in Vienna.

Filmography
 The War of the Oxen (1920)

References

Further reading

 Joan Haslip, The Emperor & the Actress: The Love Story of Emperor Franz Josef & Katharina Schratt (Dial Press, 1982)
 Georg Markus, Katharina Schratt: Die zweite Frau des Kaisers (Amalthea, 2004)
 Brigitte Hamann, Meine liebe, gute Freundin! Die Briefe Kaiser Franz Josephs an K. Schratt (Amalthea 1992)
Stefan Haderer, A highly unusual affair: The intimate relationship between Emperor Franz Joseph I of Austria and actress Katharina Schratt, Royalty Digest Quarterly, Vol. 3/2015, Rosvall Royal Books, Falköping 2015
Bourgoing, Jean de The Incredible Friendship- The Letters of Emperor Franz Joseph to Frau Katharina Schratt (1966)

External links

 Translation from German to English

19th-century Austrian actresses
Austrian stage actresses
Actors from Baden bei Wien
1853 births
1940 deaths